Boone Robert Kenneth Jenner (born June 15, 1993) is a Canadian professional ice hockey player and captain of the Columbus Blue Jackets of the National Hockey League (NHL). Jenner was selected by Columbus in the second round, 37th overall, of the 2011 NHL Entry Draft.

Playing career

Juniors
Jenner played four seasons (2009–2013) of major junior hockey with the Oshawa Generals of the Ontario Hockey League (OHL), where he scored 111 goals and 135 assists for 246 points, while earning 265 penalty minutes, in 227 games played.

Professional
On March 28, 2012, the Columbus Blue Jackets signed Jenner to a three-year, entry-level contract. As a result of the 2012–13 NHL lockout, Jenner returned to the Generals in the OHL and was named captain. He was invited to participate in the Blue Jackets abbreviated training camp in January but was one of the final cuts prior to the season beginning. Jenner finished his major junior career with 111 goals and 135 assists for 246 points, 263 penalty minutes and a cumulative +22 plus/minus rating in 227 career OHL games. Once the Generals were eliminated from the 2013 J. Ross Robertson Cup Playoffs, Jenner was reassigned to the Springfield Falcons. While playing with the Falcons, Jenner scored the overtime game-winning goal of Game 4 of the Eastern Conference semifinal against Syracuse. In eight playoff games with the Falcons, Jenner registered five points.

During the offseason, Jenner worked alongside Blue Jackets strength coach Kevin Collins, going through intense workouts geared toward preparing him for the NHL level. In September, Jenner was again invited to the Blue Jackets training camp where he earned praise from coach Todd Richards. Once the season began, Jenner was placed on a line alongside Marian Gaborik and Brandon Dubinsky whom helped him score his first and second NHL goals on October 17, 2013, against the Montreal Canadiens. His rookie season was cut short however after he suffered a leg injury on October 25 against the Toronto Maple Leafs. Jenner eventually returned to the Blue Jackets lineup on November 17, where he recorded five shot attempts and six hits during a 4–1 win over the Ottawa Senators. By January, Jenner was playing alongside Artem Anisimov and Nathan Horton while leading the team in hits with 51. He also helped the team set a new franchise record with an eight consecutive winning streak.

As the Blue Jackets approached the post-season, Jenner ranked second among league rookies in hits, third overall in game-winning goals, and fifth overall in shooting percentage. He earned praise from his teammates for his play, with Ryan Johansen saying: "Honestly, every time we dump the puck in, he's the first one in on the forecheck trying to kill someone." Upon qualifying for the 2014 Stanley Cup playoffs, Jenner and fellow rookie Jack Johnson scored their first playoff goals within three minutes of each other during Game 3. His second goal of the series came during Game 4 to help the Blue Jackets win the game 4–3. The Blue Jackets eventually fell to the Penguins and were eliminated from playoff contention.

Following his successful rookie season, Jenner was held to only 31 games during the 2014–15 NHL season due to various injuries. At the start of the season, Jenner was expected to miss five weeks following surgery on his broken hand. Upon returning to the Blue Jackets lineup, Jenner was shortly thereafter placed on their injured reserve list after he was diagnosed with a stress fracture of his back. He returned to regular team practice in March and returned to the lineup in a 3–2 win over the Calgary Flames on March 21.

Upon entering his third year with the Blue Jackets, Jenner was named an alternate captain alongside Brandon Dubinsky and captain Nick Foligno. As the season progressed, Jenner set career highs in goals, assists, and points through 63 games and ranked second on the club in goals, power play goals, game-winning goals, shots, and hits. As a result, the Jackets signed him to a two-year contract extension on February 29, 2016. He continued to produce offensively and became the fifth player in franchise history to have a 30-goal campaign.

Coming off his career-best season, Jenner suffered an injury during summer training which caused him to miss all of training camp and the preseason. Upon returning to the lineup, Jenner scored in back-to-back games against Boston and Florida but remained pointless for 11 consecutive games. However, after the NHL Trade Deadline in late February, Jenner picked up his scoring while playing alongside Alexander Wennberg and Tomas Vanek. During this stretch, he finished the regular season with seven goals and six assists for 13 points in 17 games. On July 5, 2018, Jenner signed a four-year, $15 million contract, with an average annual value of $3.75 million, to remain with the Columbus Blue Jackets. Following the signing of his contract, Jenner changed his offseason training regime. He began skating again in June and focused on his speed and agility. During the season, he scored his first career NHL hat-trick on March 12, 2019, against the Boston Bruins in a 7–4 victory. He finished the season with 16 goals and 22 assists for 38 points through 77 games.

While playing in the shortened 2020–21 season, Jenner played in his 500th career NHL game. At the time of this milestone, Jenner also ranked fifth in franchise history in goals, 14th in assists, and sixth in points. He finished the season with eight goals and nine assists for 17 points through 41 games. As a result, Jenner signed a four-year contract extension to remain with the Blue Jackets on July 28, 2021. On October 12, 2021, Jenner was named the seventh captain in Blue Jackets' franchise history.

Playing style
As a youth, Jenner was critiqued for his skating while praised for dominating in the faceoff circle. Prior to his rookie season with the Blue Jackets, Jeff Twohey, former GM of the Peterborough Petes, said: "He’s better, but even if he’s not ever going to be considered a great skater, he’ll figure out a way to succeed as a pro."

Personal life
Jenner's uncle Billy Carroll is a four-time Stanley Cup winner, winning three times with the New York Islanders and once with the Edmonton Oilers. Jenner's oldest brother Leo played five seasons with the OHL's Plymouth Whalers and played hockey for Acadia University. His cousin Marcus Carroll, Billy Carroll's son, played five OHL seasons for the Owen Sound Attack and two seasons with the ECHL's Utah Grizzlies.

Career statistics

Regular season and playoffs

International

References

External links
 

1993 births
Living people
Canadian ice hockey centres
Columbus Blue Jackets draft picks
Columbus Blue Jackets players
Ice hockey people from Ontario
Oshawa Generals players
People from Middlesex County, Ontario
Springfield Falcons players